Willie Clark Davis (born October 10, 1967 in Altheimer, Arkansas) is a former professional American football wide receiver who played for eight seasons in the National Football League for the Kansas City Chiefs, the Houston/Tennessee Oilers.  Since rejoining the Chiefs organization as a scout in 2006, Davis was promoted to the position of 'Senior Personnel Executive' in the 2021 NFL offseason.

References

1967 births
Living people
Sportspeople from Little Rock, Arkansas
American football wide receivers
Central Arkansas Bears football players
Houston Oilers players
Tennessee Oilers players
Kansas City Chiefs players